Contre Sainte-Beuve ("Against Sainte-Beuve") is an unfinished book of essays written by Marcel Proust between 1895 and 1900 and first published posthumously in 1954. The book was discovered, with its pages in order, amongst Proust's papers after his death. It consists of several essays, three of which repudiate the body of work written by Charles Augustin Sainte-Beuve, a French literary critic active in the early to mid-nineteenth century.

It was translated in 1958 by Sylvia Townsend Warner and entitled By Way of Sainte Beuve, published by Chatto & Windus.

References

Contre Sainte-Beuve
1954 books
Unfinished books
Books published posthumously
French-language books
French books
Chatto & Windus books